Joseph Shelby Crisp (July 8, 1885 – February 5, 1939) was a catcher in Major League Baseball. He played for the St. Louis Browns.

References

External links

Major League Baseball catchers
St. Louis Browns players
Tulsa Oilers (baseball) players
Leavenworth Old Soldiers players
Winnipeg Maroons (baseball) players
Mobile Sea Gulls players
Kansas City Blues (baseball) players
Newark Indians players
Topeka Jayhawks players
Oakland Oaks (baseball) players
Jersey City Skeeters players
Sioux City Indians players
Baseball players from Missouri
People from Higginsville, Missouri
1885 births
1939 deaths